The Tunis Commitment was a consensus statement of the World Summit on the Information Society, adopted on November 18, 2005, in Tunis, Tunisia.

See also
Tunis Agenda for the Information Society

External links
Tunis Commitment (pdf).

International Telecommunication Union